Reproductive Health is an online-only open access medical journal with a focus on sexual health. It was established in 2004 and is published continuously by BioMed Central. The editors-in-chief are José M. Belizán (Institute for Clinical Effectiveness and Health Policy) and Sanni Yaya (University of Ottawa). According to the Journal Citation Reports, the journal has a 2018 impact factor of 2.295.

References

External links

Online-only journals
BioMed Central academic journals
Publications established in 2004
Continuous journals
English-language journals
Reproductive health journals